Old Medan City Hall is a building located on Jalan Balai Kota (City Hall Street), Medan, North Sumatra.

Description
The Old Medan City Hall was built in 1908 during the Dutch colonial period. The building was designed by C. Boon, an architect for the Deli Group.

The City Hall is kilometre zero in Medan, and was originally built for the Bank of Java (now Bank Indonesia), but was instead purchased by the City Council of Medan. Its bell was donated in 1913 from the Tjong A Fie Mansion.

Medan City Hall is now owned and managed by the Grand CityHall Hotel hotel-office-retail complex, situated just behind it.

Gallery

References

See also
Colonial architecture of Indonesia
List of colonial buildings in Medan
Medan Post Office

Buildings and structures in Medan
City and town halls in Indonesia
Cultural Properties of Indonesia in North Sumatra
Dutch colonial architecture in Indonesia